Perambur, is a neighbourhood in the northern region of Chennai, Tamil Nadu, India.

Perambur may also refer to:

 Perambur railway station
 Perambur (state assembly constituency)
 Perambur Loco Works railway station
 Perambur Flyover Park
 Perambur taluk
 Perambur Carriage Works railway station
 Perambur railway hospital